NEL LINES (Naftiliaki Eteria Lesvou) was established in 1972, as a company of popular base with shareholders the residents of Lesvos island and primary aim the purchase of a liner vessel for the Mitilini-Chios-Piraeus route. Since then, the company has expanded, serving most of the Aegean sea destinations.

More specifically, with high-speed and conventional passenger-ferry boats executes intra-Cyladic  itineraries connecting Syra and Lavrion with Eastern, Central and Western Cyclades, Lavrion with Psara and Mesta of Chios,  Heraklion and Rethimno with Santorini and Thessaloniki  and Volos with the Sporades complex.

With passenger-ferry boats NEL LINES also executes itineraries between Piraeus, Chios and Mitilini and connects the islands of Northern Aegean with Thessaloniki, Kavala and Lavrion.

In 2015 Nel lines declared bankruptcy and ceased operations, citing the financial crises and losing subsidized routes rival to rival operators.

Former Fleet

Sappho (1973-2002) scrapped as Santori in Alang, India in 2004
Arion (1975-1981) When the ship was in Haifa with 250 passengers on board, a bomb exploded on board. The ship was towed out and sunk outside the harbor in 1981. The ship then towed and laid-up in Elefsina and then sold for scrap in Barcelona, Spain
Homerus (1977-1993) scrapped as Veesham IX in Alang, India in 2003.
Alcaeos (1981-2002) scrapped as Sochi Express in Aliaga, Turkey in 2004.
Odysseas Elytis (1982-1985) scrapped as Safa in Alang, India in 2005.
Agios Rafael (1989-2001) sank in 2013 near China when she went for scrapping.
Mytilene (1990-2015) laid-up in Elefsina since 2015. Sold for scrap as Lene in Aliaga, Turkey in 2022.
Theofilos (1995-2015) laid-up in Perama since 2019. Sold for scrap as Ilos in Aliaga, Turkey in 2022.
Taxiarchis (1999-2015) laid-up in Perama since 2015.
Aeolos Kenteris I (2000-2011) laid-up in Perama since 2011.
Aeolos Kenteris II (2001-2011) laid-up in Perama since 2011.
Aeolos Kenteris (2001-2011) partially sunk in Augusta, Italy since 2018.
Panagia Tinou (2007-2009) caught up fire in Tripoli, Lebanon in 2016 and sold for scrap in Aliaga, Turkey in 2016.
Panagia Hozoviotissa (2007-2010) scrapped in Aliaga, Turkey in 2010.
Panagia Thalassini (2007-2015) sold to Idomeneas Lines as Kalli P but is laid-up in Perama since 2015.
Panagia Parou (2007-2018) partially sank in Algeciras port in 2017, towed up and went for scrap in Aliaga, Turkey in 2018.
Aqua Jewel (2010-2014) as Aqua Jewel for Seajets since 2017.
European Express (2010-2019) scrapped as Express in Aliaga, Turkey in 2019.
Colossus (2010-2013) scrapped in Alang, India in 2013.
Mykonos (2010-2013) as Talos for Creta Cargo Lines since 2014.
Alkioni (2010-2019) as Cat I for Magic Sea Ferries since 2019.
Ippotis (2010-2014) scrapped in Aliaga, Turkey in 2014.
Cyclades Express (2010-2016) as Naxos Jet for Seajets since 2016.
Aqua Maria (2010-2016) laid-up in Drapetsona as Alexandra L since 2018.
Olympus (2010-2017) Scrapped in Alang, India in 2017.
Aqua Hercules (2010-2017) partially sank in Iskenderun since 2021.
Aqua Spirit (2010-2015) as Northern Sea Wolf for BC Ferries since 2017.
Ionian Sky (2013-2020) scrapped in Aliaga, Turkey in 2020.

References

Ferry companies of Greece
Companies listed on the Athens Exchange
Companies based in Lesbos
Greek brands
2015 disestablishments in Greece